The 2002 Hamilton Tiger-Cats season was the 45th season for the team in the Canadian Football League and their 53rd overall. The Tiger-Cats finished in 3rd place in the East Division with a 7–11 record and missed the playoffs for the first time since 1997. Despite having a 6–3 record at home, the Ti-Cats were 1–8 in away games, claiming that win in their last away game of the season.

Offseason

CFL draft

Preseason

Roster

Regular season

Season standings

Schedule

Awards and honours

2002 CFL All-Stars

References

Hamilton Tiger-Cats seasons
Hamilton